North Bay City Council is the governing body of the city of North Bay, Ontario, Canada.

Unlike many Canadian city councils, North Bay does not elect its council on a ward system. Instead, all councillors are elected at-large, and the ten candidates with the most votes are declared elected to council. Unlike the similar system in place for Vancouver City Council elections, however, North Bay municipal politics does not have a political party system.

The councillor with the most votes serves as deputy mayor, while the second and third-place finishers chair the council's two primary committees, community services and public works and engineering.

As in other Ontario municipalities, the council may choose to fill a vacancy either by scheduling a by-election or by directly appointing a new councillor to the seat. Due to the city's at-large electoral system, if the appointment process is chosen then the first right to fill a vacant seat is generally offered to the next highest unelected finisher in the previous municipal election. For instance, when Peter Chirico resigned from council in May 2012, Sarah Campbell, the eleventh-place candidate in the 2010 election, was appointed to his seat. Following the resignation of Sean Lawlor from council in November 2013, twelfth-place finisher Mark King was the next in line to be appointed to the vacant seat, and was appointed to council as of January 6, 2014.

2006-2010
Council elected in the 2006 election:

2010-2014
Council elected in the 2010 election:

In May 2012, Peter Chirico resigned his seat as the city's deputy mayor to take a job as managing director of community services in the city's administrative staff. Sean Lawlor succeeded him as deputy mayor, and Sarah Campbell, a former city councillor who narrowly lost re-election in 2010, was reappointed to fill the vacant council seat. Lawlor subsequently resigned from council on November 18, 2013.

2014-2018
Council elected in the 2014 election:

2018-2022
Council elected in the 2018 election:

References

External links
 North Bay City Council 

1891 establishments in Ontario
Municipal councils in Ontario
Politics of North Bay, Ontario